Konstantinos Bouloulis (born 7 December 1993) is a Greek professional footballer who plays as a defensive midfielder for Super League 2 club Kallithea.

He became a professional football player at 17 years old with total of 162 professional appearances in all Greek categories. He also studied sociology with a degree from Panteion university of Athens.

References

1993 births
Living people
Greek footballers
Super League Greece players
Football League (Greece) players
Gamma Ethniki players
Atromitos F.C. players
Ionikos F.C. players
Ethnikos Piraeus F.C. players
PAS Lamia 1964 players
Association football midfielders
Footballers from Lamia (city)